Soundtrack of passion is a 2009 romantic thriller film directed by Nikolai Lebedev.

Plot 
The film tells the story of the pursuit of love and freedom. Vita, employee of a private detective agency, falls in love with a tall blue-eyed stranger whom she met on an island located in the center of an expansive lake in a Moscow suburb. All-consuming passion arises between them. Blinded by it, Vita does not suspect that Adam is the man whom she wiretapped for her work and that soon she will have to eliminate him.

Cast
Elena Nikolaeva as Vita (voice Svetlana Ivanova)
Fabio Fulco as Adam
Sergei Garmash as Gennady
Nina Usatova as Regina
Anatoly Bely as Kosobutsky
Olga Litvinova as Alya
Nikolai Machulsky as Dmitry
Svetlana Toma as Vita's Mama 
Nina Grebeshkova as Adam's neighbor
 Pyotr Dranga as waiter

Awards
Nika Award nomination for Best Sound Engineering  (2010)

References

External links
 

2009 films
Russian romantic thriller films
2000s romantic thriller films
Films directed by Nikolai Lebedev